Greigia berteroi is a plant species in the genus Greigia. This species is endemic to the Juan Fernández Islands in the South Pacific, off the coast of Chile.

The species is listed as critically endangered.

References

berteroi
Endemic flora of Chile
Flora of the Juan Fernández Islands
Plants described in 1921